Ek Mutthi Aasmaan is a 1973 Bollywood drama film directed by Virender Sinha. The film stars Vijay Arora and Yogeeta Bali.

Cast
Vijay Arora  
Radha Saluja   
Mehmood   
Yogita Bali   
Pran   
Kamal Kapoor   
I. S. Johar   
Aruna Irani   
Kamini Kaushal   
Gulshan Arora   
Lalita Pawar
Sanjeeva Bangera

Songs
All songs were written by Indeevar.

"Pyar Kabhi Kam Na Karana Sanam Har Kami Ganvara Kar Lenge" - Vani Jairam, Kishore Kumar
"Har Koi Chahta Hai Ek Mutthi Aasmaan" (version 1) - Kishore Kumar
"Har Koi Chahta Hai Ek Mutthi Aasmaan" (version 2) - Kishore Kumar
"Har Koi Chahta Hai Ek Mutthi Aasmaan" (version 3) - Kishore Kumar
"Har Koi Chahta Hai Ek Mutthi Aasmaan" (version 4) - Kishore Kumar
"Khile Kamal Si Kaaya Teri" - Lata Mangeshkar
"Tu Ki Samjhega Tenu Ki Dasiye" - Manna Dey
"Baat Baat Hai Ek Raat Ki" - Asha Bhosle
"Tu Tu Hai Qaatil, Tera Bachna Hai Mushkil,Chahe Duniya Na Jaane" - Asha Bhosle

References

External links
 

1973 films
1970s Hindi-language films
1973 drama films
Films scored by Madan Mohan